Pefnos or Pephnos or Pephnus, or Pephnum or Pephnon (Πεφνόν), was a town of ancient Laconia, on the eastern coast of the Messenian Gulf, distant 20 stadia from Thalamae. Nowadays, the village Agios Dimitrios of the municipality of West Mani is near or on the spot that ancient Pefnos existed.  In front of it, there is a small island of the same name (Pefnos island), which Pausanias describes as not larger than a great rock, in which stood, in the open air, brazen statues of the Dioscuri, a foot high. There was a tradition, that the Dioscuri were born in this island. The island is at the mouth of the river Miléa, which is the minor Pamisus of Strabo. The Messenians said that their territories originally extended as far as Pefnos.

In July 2020 a statue of an egg was placed on the island, depicting the union of Zeus (transformed to a swan) with Leda and proposing that Helen of Troy was born on this island. The professor of classical archaeology Petros Themelis and the Minister of Culture and Sports of Greece Lina Mendoni stated that Helen of Troy was born on the island and inaugurated the statue at 22 August 2020.

References

Populated places in ancient Laconia
Populated places in ancient Messenia
Former populated places in Greece
Locations in Greek mythology

External links 
 Google maps location of Pefnos
 Youtube: "The birth of beautiful Helen at Pefnos" Drone video of the construction of the statue of Pefnos, with English subtitles
 [https://www.facebook.com/Η-γέννηση-της-Ωραίας-Ελένης-στη-βραχονησίδα-Πέφνο-614729455848919 Facebook page of statue of Pefnos in Greek